Lorenzo 1990–1995 is the second compilation album by Italian singer-songwriter Jovanotti, released by Mercury Records in 1995.

Track listing

Charts and certifications

Peak positions

Certifications

References

1995 albums
Jovanotti albums
Italian-language albums